Foolish Lake is a lake in Fresno County, California, in the United States.

Foolish Lake was so named by a biologist who, noting the lack of scenery, wrote "it would be foolish for anyone ever to revisit it".

See also
List of lakes in California

References

Lakes of Fresno County, California
Lakes of California
Lakes of Northern California